The North American Football Confederation (NAFC) was founded in 1946 as the governing body of association football in Northern America, Mexico, and Cuba. The first president of the NAFC was Carlos Alonso who was elected on 19 December 1946 in Havana. In 1961 it merged with the Confederación Centroamericana y del Caribe de Fútbol (CCCF) to form CONCACAF.

Member nations
The following nations represented the NAFC:

NAFC Championship
The NAFC organized four international tournaments known as the NAFC Championship. The winners were:
 1947 – 
 1949 – 
 1990 – 
 1991 –

See also 
 Confederacion Centroamericana y del Caribe de Futbol (CCCF)
 CONCACAF
 North American Football Union (NAFU)
 Central American Football Union (UNCAF)
 Caribbean Football Union (CFU)

References

External links
NAFC, CCCF and CONCACAF Championships

Defunct association football governing bodies
Association football governing bodies in North America
Sports organizations established in 1946
1946 establishments in North America
Organizations disestablished in 1961